Peduel is an Israeli settlement in the West Bank. Located about 10 km from the Palestinian city of Burqin, 25 km east of Tel Aviv and adjacent to Alei Zahav, Beit Aryeh-Ofarim and Brukhin, it is organised as a community settlement and falls under the jurisdiction of Shomron Regional Council. The Shilo Stream passes to the south, and the Shilo Stream Nature Preserve borders Peduel on the north and west.

The international community considers Israeli settlements in the West Bank illegal under international law, but the Israeli government disputes this.

History
Founded in 1984 on state lands by a group of Orthodox Jewish Israelis from Yeshivat Har Etzion in Alon Shvut with help from Amana, the yishuv is now home to about 200 families. The town's name is symbolic and is derived from the bible: "And the ransomed of the Lord shall return, and come with singing unto Zion" (Isaiah 35,10 and 51,11). The word ransomed in Hebrew is "Pedui", and Pedu-el means "ransomed by God".

Peduel is founded on land which Israel expropriated from the Palestinian towns of Deir Ballut and Kafr ad-Dik.

In 2020, Peduel was one of several Israeli settlement which dumped its untreated sewage onto  Deir Ballut land.

Education
There are many institutions located on the settlement: a nursery, three kindergartens, an elementary school, a talmud torah, and the combined pre-army and hesder Eretz Hatzvi yeshiva.

References

External links
Official website
Mosdot Peduel - Yeshiva & Pre Army Training
Photos of Peduel 

Populated places established in 1984
Religious Israeli settlements
1984 establishments in the Palestinian territories
Israeli settlements in the West Bank